Harold Daniel Osorio Moreno (born 20 August 2003) is a Salvadoran professional footballer who plays as an attacking midfielder for MLS Next Pro club Chicago Fire II and the El Salvador national team.

References

External links

Living people
Salvadoran footballers
El Salvador international footballers
Association football midfielders
2003 births
El Salvador under-20 international footballers
Chicago Fire FC II players
Salvadoran expatriate footballers
Salvadoran expatriate sportspeople in the United States
Expatriate soccer players in the United States
Alianza F.C. footballers
MLS Next Pro players